"Dreams Come True" is a song recorded by South Korean girl group S.E.S. from their second studio album, Sea & Eugene & Shoo (1998). The song is a cover of "Rakastuin mä looseriin" ("Like a Fool"), released in 1996 by Finnish girl group Nylon Beat. It was originally composed by Finnish producer Risto Asikainen, with further composition of the Korean version handled by Yoo Young-jin while the lyrics were translated by Yoo along with group member Bada.

Background
"Dreams Come True" is an adapted version of the song "Like a Fool" (1996) by Finnish pop duo Nylon Beat. It has been described as a smooth dance number with a moderate 1980s synth beat, utilizing synth flute hooks and soft vocal phrasings. SM Entertainment licensed the song from the original composers and reproduced it by adding Korean vocals, sound fills, and newly arranged parts in the last third of the song. The instrumental track (except for the added parts) remains identical to the original, and it retains the melodic and harmonic structure.

On November 11, 2021, its accompanying music video was remastered and published to SM's YouTube channel.

Cover performances
On February 27, 2009, members Taeyeon, Sunny, Yuri and Seohyun of Girls' Generation performed a cover version of "Dreams Come True" during the Music Bank History section of the 500th episode of KBS Music Bank. On September 12, 2015, Sonamoo performed a cover of the song on Show! Music Core. During the 2018 SBS Gayo Daejeon festival, Irene, Seulgi and Joy of Red Velvet and Momo, Chaeyoung and Tzuyu of Twice performed together a cover version of "Dreams Come True" for the 20th anniversary of the single's release.

Reception 
"Dreams Come True" achieved the top spots on several music programs in South Korea during its promotion. In 2021, "Dreams Come True" was ranked number 86 in online portal Melon and newspaper Seoul Shinmuns list of top 100 K-pop songs of all-time.

Aespa version

"Dreams Come True" is a remake song recorded by South Korean girl group Aespa. Originally recorded and released as a single by S.E.S. in 1998, the song was re-recorded by Aespa and was released by SM Entertainment on December 20, 2021, as part of SM's Remastering Project, and also as the lead single of the album 2021 Winter SM Town: SMCU Express. South Korean singer, BoA, participated in the song's production, choreography and visual aspects. It was later included on the group's second extended play Girls which was released on July 8, 2022.

Background
"Dreams Come True" was originally recorded and released by S.E.S. in 1998, becoming a hit single from their second studio album, Sea & Eugene & Shoo, but that song was based on a Finnish hit single released in 1996 called "Rakastuin mä looseriin" (= I fell in love with a loser) from the Finnish duo Nylon Beat. On November 4, 2021, SM Entertainment announced that Aespa would be releasing a cover of "Dreams Come True", slated for release in December. The group is additionally set to remake the "Dream Comes True" music video, as part of the agency's "Remastering Project", where younger generation groups will present new versions of older generation music videos. On December 11, 2021, it was revealed that the song and a music video for the group's version would be released on December 20, 2021, as a part of the project. Aespa's member Giselle revealed that the group "have tried to add [their] own colours to the original track".

Composition
The lyrics for "Dreams Come True" were written by Bada, Yoo Young-jin, BoA and produced by the latter two with Shaun Kim, BXN, and Risto Asikainen. The song is mainly a "crisp" pop song with strong influence from trap and hip hop elements. Lyrically, the only difference between the two versions is that the group's one features a new verse: "Yeah, get it on nah Get it on nah / Let's bring back to Nineties". The remake's unique young energy and contemporary style are added "to build a soundscape that pays homage to S.E.S's artistry whilst also showcasing the vocal prowess of the girl group".  Clash described the remake as "a thrilling reinvention" with "scintillating" chorus and "crisp" pop and hip-hop elements added to its production.

Music video

An accompanying music video for the song was uploaded to SM's YouTube channel in conjunction with the release of "Dreams Come True"; the video was preceded with a teaser—which was released via the same platform one day earlier. The "otherworldly" visual combines the dreamy aesthetics from S.E.S.'s original music video with their Aespa's edgy, futuristic signature style. In the video, the group is performing the song's choreography from a grand, purple-tinted room filled with alien-like flora to a street-styled contemporary space. Later in another scene, Aespa is seen on a massive skyscraper design platform alongside projections of their virtual versions. The holographic butterflies and wings from the original music video have been retained.

Divyansha Dongre of Rolling Stone India described the video's sets as "futuristic and flamboyant". NMEs Gladys Yeo wrote that the "otherworldly new visual" combines "the dreamy aesthetic" from S.E.S.'s original music video with Aespa's "own edgy, futuristic signature style".  Writing for Clash, Robin Murray noted the "tightly choreographed video" for its "alien-like flora" surrounding the group.

Track listing Digital download / streaming"Dreams Come True" – 3:24
"Dreams Come True" (Instrumental) – 3:24

 Credits and personnel 
Credits adapted from Melon.Studio SM BoomingSystem – recording, digital editing, mixing
 SonicKorea – masteringPersonnel'

 Aespa – vocals, background vocals
 Bada – lyrics
 Yoo Young-jin – lyrics, composition, directing, background vocals, recording, digital editing, mixing
 BoA – lyrics, composition, arrangement, directing
 Risto Armas Asikainen – composition
 Shaun Kim – arrangement
 BXN – arrangement
 Jeon Hoon – mastering
 Shin Soo-min – mastering assistant

Charts

Weekly charts

Monthly charts

Year-end chart

Release history

References

1998 songs
SM Entertainment singles
S.E.S. (group) songs
Works based on Finnish works
Songs written by Yoo Young-jin